The Hebrew Christian Alliance of Great Britain, known today as the British Messianic Jewish Alliance, was founded in 1866 by Carl Schwartz "to promote the combination of Jewish heritage and Christian theology."  It incorporated the Hebrew Christian Prayer Union, founded by Henry Aaron Stern in 1882.

Foundations
Beginning in the 19th century, some groups had attempted to create congregations and societies of Jews who had converted to Christianity. The London Society for promoting Christianity amongst the Jews (currently named "Church's Ministry Among Jewish People") was formed in 1809.

The first identifiable congregation made up exclusively of Jews who had converted to Christianity was established in the United Kingdom as early as 1860.

First congregations
The first congregation of Jewish Christians in the United Kingdom was Beni Abraham "which came into existence in London when forty-one Hebrew Christians assembled as Jewish Christians". "In 1866 the Hebrew Christian Alliance of Great Britain was organised with branches in several European countries and the United States. These organisations had the combined effect of encouraging Jewish believers in Jesus to think of themselves as a community with a unique identity."

The International Hebrew Christian Alliance, established 1925, was an initiative of the Hebrew Christian Alliance of America (established 1915) and the Hebrew Christian Alliance of Great Britain.

See also
 Hebrew Christian movement
 Hebrew Christian Alliance of America
 Messianic Judaism

Further reading
University of Cambria "Overview of World Religions

References

Hebrew Christian movement
Religious organizations established in 1866
1866 establishments in the United Kingdom
Conversion of Jews to Christianity